Myer Horowitz  (December 27, 1932 – October 24, 2022) was a Canadian academic who served as the ninth president of the University of Alberta from 1979 to 1989.

Early life and education 

Horowitz was born in Montreal, Quebec on December 27, 1932. He attended the School for Teachers at McGill University and received his BA at Sir George Williams College in 1956. He earned a Master of Education from the University of Alberta in 1959 and a Doctor of Education from Stanford University in 1965.

Academic career 

Horowitz taught for eight years in Montreal before accepting a position as a professor in the Faculty of Education at McGill University. He left McGill in 1969 to Alberta, where he accepted a position of Chair of the University of Alberta's Department of Elementary Education. He would later go on to serve various other academic positions in the University of Alberta: Dean of the Faculty of Education (1972–1975) and Vice-President (Academic) (1975–1979).

Horowitz became the ninth president of the University of Alberta on August 1, 1979, succeeding Harry Gunning. He became known for his advocation for widely accessible early childhood services - something that he continued to fight for after his retirement as president in 1989, fighting against the Alberta government's decision to reduce funding for kindergartens. He was succeeded as president by Paul Davenport.

He became the Professor Emeritus of Education in 1989 and President Emeritus in 1999 in the U of A. He moved to Victoria, British Columbia in 1998 and became the adjunct professor of Education at the University of Victoria. He was also involved with the University of Victoria's Centre for Youth and Society and Centre for Early Childhood Research and Policy.

Personal life and death 

Horowitz was made an officer of the Order of Canada in 1990, and has received nine honorary doctorate degrees. The Myer Horowitz Theatre on the University of Alberta Campus is named in his honour. 

Horowitz died on October 24, 2022, at the age of 89.

References

1932 births
2022 deaths
Anglophone Quebec people
Canadian Jews
Officers of the Order of Canada
Academics from Montreal
McGill University Faculty of Education alumni
University of Alberta alumni
Stanford University alumni
Academic staff of McGill University
Presidents of the University of Alberta
Academic staff of the University of Alberta
Academic staff of the University of Victoria